Correspondence is the first full-length studio album by Peter Godwin. The album was released in 1983.

Track listing
All songs written by Peter Godwin; unless otherwise noted
"Baby's in the Mountains" - 4:14
"The Art of Love" - 5:31
"Window Shopping" - 3:12
"Soul to Soul" - 5:33
"Young Pleasure" - 4:24
"The Dancer" - 4:23
"Correspondence" - 3:35
"Over Twenty-One" (Georg Kajanus) - 3:09
"Soul of Love" - 4:45

Personnel
Technical
Raphael Preston - engineer
Neville Brody - art direction, design
Peter Ashworth - photography

1983 debut albums
Peter Godwin albums
Polydor Records albums